Charles-Gustave Kuhn (28 April 1889 – 18 December 1952) was a Swiss horse rider who competed in the 1928 Summer Olympics.

In 1928 he and his horse Pepita won the bronze medal in the individual jumping competition. They also finished eighth as part of the Swiss jumping team in the team jumping competition.

References

External links
profile

1889 births
1952 deaths
Equestrians at the 1928 Summer Olympics
Olympic bronze medalists for Switzerland
Olympic equestrians of Switzerland
Swiss show jumping riders
Swiss male equestrians
Olympic medalists in equestrian
Medalists at the 1928 Summer Olympics
20th-century Swiss people